Allotheria (meaning "other beasts", from the Greek , –other and , –wild animal) is an extinct branch of successful Mesozoic mammals.  The most important characteristic was the presence of lower molariform teeth equipped with two longitudinal rows of cusps. Allotheria includes Multituberculata, Gondwanatheria (which may be part of Multituberculata, as the sister group to Cimolodonta), and probably Haramiyida, although some studies show them to be more basal mammaliaforms rather than true mammals, therefore differing from true allotheres significantly.

Allotheres also had a narrow pelvis, indicating that they gave birth to tiny helpless young like marsupials or laid eggs and produced milk through mammary glands to feed their young like monotremes do. This is a feature of all non-placental mammals.

Interpretations
When he first identified Allotheria in 1880, Othniel Marsh regarded this group as an order within Marsupialia. However, in 1997 McKenna and Bell classified Allotheria as an infraclass.

References

Further reading
Zofia Kielan-Jaworowska, Richard L. Cifelli, and Zhe-Xi Luo, Mammals from the Age of Dinosaurs: Origins, Evolution, and Structure (New York: Columbia University Press, 2004), 249.

 
Prehistoric mammals
Mammal taxonomy
Norian first appearances
Late Triassic first appearances
Miocene extinctions
Fossil taxa described in 1880